Félix Antonio Rodríguez (born September 9, 1972) is a Dominican former Major League Baseball relief pitcher.

Major league career (1996–2006)
During the northern hemisphere winter, the Dodgers sent Rodríguez to play for their Australian affiliate the Adelaide Giants in the Australian Baseball League in 1993 as part of his pitching development.

In , he played for the Arizona Diamondbacks, then with the San Francisco Giants from -. He started 2004 with the Giants before being traded to the Philadelphia Phillies. It was with the Giants that Rodriguez had several crucial postseason failures. In Game 2 of the 2000 NLDS, he allowed a two-run homer to Edgardo Alfonzo of the New York Mets in the 9th inning and later an RBI single in the 10th inning that won the game for the Mets.

In Game Two of the 2002 World Series, Rodriguez gave up a three-run home run to Tim Salmon of the Angels in the eighth inning that proved to be the deciding blow. In Game Six of the 2002 World Series, he gave up the rally-starting home run to Angels first baseman Scott Spiezio that started the rally that lost the game for the Giants—a game in which the Giants had led 5–0 at one point. The resulting loss is often cited as the decisive turning point in the series.  And in the 2003 NLDS Rodriguez gave up a key two out, two run single in Game 4 that eventually proved the difference in the game that won the series for the Florida Marlins. He began  with the New York Yankees, after being traded from the Phillies for center fielder Kenny Lofton in a one-for-one deal. In spring training , he signed with the Montreal Expos, he was designated for assignment at the end of the season.

Years after Majors (2007–2009)

He signed a minor league deal with the Florida Marlins but didn't make the team and was released on March 28. He finished the 2007 season playing for the Kia Tigers in the Korea Baseball Organization.

In , Rodríguez played for the Camden Riversharks in the independent Atlantic League and had a 1.09 ERA in 32 games. In February , he signed a minor league contract with the Boston Red Sox. Though he did not make the spring training roster and was released. He returned to the Camden Riversharks for the 2009 season.

References

External links

1972 births
Albuquerque Dukes players
Arizona Diamondbacks players
Arizona League Diamondbacks players
Camden Riversharks players
Cincinnati Reds players
Dominican Republic expatriate baseball players in South Korea
Dominican Republic expatriate baseball players in the United States
Great Falls Dodgers players
Gulf Coast Dodgers players
Indianapolis Indians players
KBO League pitchers
Kia Tigers players

Living people
Los Angeles Dodgers players
Major League Baseball players from the Dominican Republic
Major League Baseball pitchers
New Orleans Zephyrs players
New York Yankees players
People from Monte Cristi Province
Philadelphia Phillies players
Potomac Nationals players
San Antonio Missions players
San Francisco Giants players
Staten Island Yankees players
Trenton Thunder players
Tucson Sidewinders players
Vero Beach Dodgers players
Washington Nationals players
Dominican Republic expatriate baseball players in Australia
Adelaide Bite players
Criollos de Caguas players
Dominican Republic expatriate baseball players in Puerto Rico